HMS Atalanta was a 14 gun ship sloop of the Swan class, launched on 12 August 1775.  She served during the American Revolutionary War.  On 28 May 1781, Atlanta was engaged by the privateer Alliance, in which 24 crew were killed or wounded. In May 1782, under the command of Brett, she destroyed an American privateer (6 guns, 25 men), under then command of Ayret, near Cape d'Or. Privateers from Cumberland (including Samuel Rogers) were on board. The privateers escaped to the woods leaving their provisions, which Captain Brett took to Cumberland.

She also served in the French Revolutionary War, and was then renamed HMS Helena in March 1797 before being sold for disposal in 1802.

References

 
 Winfield, Rif, British Warships in the Age of Sail 1714-1792: Design, Construction, Careers and Fates. Seaforth Publishing, 2007. .

External links
 

Atalanta (1775)
1775 ships
Swan-class ship-sloops